Kauppila is a Finnish surname. Notable people with the surname include:

 Jani Kauppila (born 1980), Finnish footballer
 Jari Kauppila (born 1974), Finnish ice hockey player
 Raimo Kauppila, Finnish sports shooter

Finnish-language surnames